Mengzhou is a County-level city in Henan province, People's Republic of China. It is administered by the prefecture-level city Jiaozuo. Its population in 1999 stood at 341,190.

Administrative divisions
As 2012, this city is divided to 4 subdistricts and 7 towns.
Subdistricts

Towns

Climate

Economy
Mengzhou's main industries are machinery manufacturing, fur processing, food processing, and chemical production. The city's GDP in 2006 was 8.68 billion yuan (1.09 billion USD).

References

External links
Government Website 

Cities in Henan
Jiaozuo